The Gateway Multimodal Transportation Center, also known as  Gateway Station, is a rail and bus terminal station in downtown St. Louis, Missouri.  Opened in 2008 and operating 24 hours a day, it serves Amtrak trains and Greyhound and Burlington Trailways interstate buses. Missouri's largest rail transportation station, it is located one block east of St. Louis Union Station.

Gateway Station cost $31.4 million to build. and after more than a year of delays, it fully opened November 19, 2008. The station's unique design has won several awards, including 2009 St. Louis Construction News and Real Estates Regional Excellence Award, 2008 Best New Building by the Riverfront Times, and the 2009 Award of Merit - Illuminating Engineering Society Illumination Awards.

Transportation
Gateway Station serves as a terminal hub for Amtrak, Metrolink, and Greyhound.

Amtrak
Of the 13 Missouri stations served by Amtrak, St. Louis was the busiest in FY2017, seeing an average of over 1,000 passengers daily.  The station is served by Amtrak's Missouri River Runner, Lincoln Service, and the Texas Eagle, with a total of 14 trains daily. All but the Texas Eagle originate or terminate at the station.

MetroLink 
Gateway Station is next to the 1993-built Civic Center MetroLink station, which serves both of the system's lines, the Red Line and Blue Line.

It takes about 30 minutes to travel to Lambert-St. Louis International Airport's Terminal 1 and Terminal 2 via the Metro Red Line.

The Transportation Center would also be the hub for the two proposed St. Louis Commuter Rail lines.

Bus transportation 
Intercity bus services are provided by Amtrak Thruway Motorcoach, Greyhound Lines, Burlington Trailways and Megabus.

Previous Amtrak facilities in St. Louis
Created in 1971, Amtrak originally operated from St. Louis Union Station. However, when it became apparent that there were no longer enough trains serving St. Louis to justify the use of such a large facility, Union Station was abandoned in November 1978. Amtrak then moved to a modular structure two blocks east, at 550 S. 16th St; the new station was originally approved on a site west of Union Station in 1976, with a budget of $6.4 million. Intended for temporary use, this station – soon dubbed "Amshack"  – remained in service for 26 years, even after Union Station reopened and long past the end of its useful life. On December 20, 2004, Amtrak moved across the street to 551 South 16th Street, a  masonry and steel "interim" structure built at an estimated cost of $600,000. The building now houses Amtrak operating and mechanical crews.

See also

List of Amtrak stations

References

External links

 Status of Amtrak's Texas Eagle trains through St. Louis
 Former St. Louis Amtrak Stations (USA RailGuide -- TrainWeb)

Transit centers in the United States
Rail in St. Louis
Amtrak stations in Missouri
Railway stations in the United States opened in 2008
Transportation buildings and structures in St. Louis
Downtown West, St. Louis